No Frills Video is a video containing official Skid Row videos originally released on VHS in 1993. The video album features all the music videos from the Slave to the Grind album and the B-Side Ourselves EP. Running time is 40 minutes.

No Frills Video is available on DVD.

Track listing
"Monkey Business"
"Wasted Time"
"Slave to the Grind"
"Quicksand Jesus"
"Little Wing"
"Psycho Therapy"
"Wasted Time"
"In a Darkened Room"

References

Skid Row (American band) video albums
1993 video albums